Vanuatu (formerly called the New Hebrides) is a nation and group of islands in the South Pacific Ocean.

It is part of Oceania. Its immediate neighbours include the Solomon Islands and New Caledonia, and Australia is the closest continent.

Terrain 
Vanuatu is a mountainous archipelago of volcanic origin with narrow coastal plains.

Its tropical climate is moderated by southeast trade winds, and its natural resources include, hardwood forests, and fish. As of 2011, 1.64% of its land area is arable, 10.25% is devoted to crops, and a further 88.11% to other land usage.

Natural disasters include tropical cyclones or typhoons from January to April and volcanic activity which sometimes causes minor earthquakes.  Tsunamis are also a hazard.

A majority of the population does not have access to a potable and reliable supply of water. Deforestation is another major concern on the islands.

Vanuatu is party to a number of international agreements, including agreements on Antarctic-Marine Living Resources, Biodiversity, Climate Change, Climate Change-Kyoto Protocol, Desertification, Endangered Species, Law of the Sea, Marine Dumping, Ozone Layer Protection, Ship Pollution, and Tropical Timber 94.

Closely tied to the Law of the Sea, Vanuatu lays maritime claim to 24 nautical miles (nm) of contiguous zone, 12 nm of territorial sea, and 200 nm of continental shelf and exclusive economic zone.

Climate 
Vanuatu has a tropical climate, more specifically a tropical rainforest climate (Af in the Köppen climate classification), with noticeably wetter and drier months and hot, humid conditions year-round.. As the trade winds are almost permanent and tropical cyclones are not rare in Port Vila and Vanuatu, the climate is not equatorial but a maritime trade-wind tropical climate.

Vanuatu can be affected by tropical cyclones. Cyclone Pam was one of the worst cyclones to ever hit Vanuatu, and had been described as a worst-case scenario for the country, with the estimated cost of damage being in the hundreds of millions. In 2020, Cyclone Harold caused severe damage to Vanuatu and other Pacific nations.

References